Hickleton and Thurnscoe Halt was a small railway station on the Hull and Barnsley Railway line between Wrangbrook Junction and Wath-upon-Dearne. The halt was built to serve the mining villages of Hickleton and Thurnscoe, near Barnsley, South Yorkshire and was situated in the centre of Thurnscoe at the point where the line crosses over the main Barnsley road.

The platform surface was of gravel and the station opened on 28 August 1902 and closed, along with the others on the line, on 6 April 1929.

The line was controlled by two standard H&B style signal boxes named "Hickleton Station" and "Hickleton Colliery".

Immediately south of the station was the entrance to Hickleton Main Colliery where the H&B shared sidings with the Swinton and Knottingley Joint Railway line.

External links
 Hickleton and Thurnscoe Halt station on navigable 1955 O. S. map

Disused railway stations in Barnsley
Former Hull and Barnsley Railway stations
Railway stations in Great Britain opened in 1902
Railway stations in Great Britain closed in 1929